Touré is the French transcription of a West African surname (English transcriptions are Turay and Touray). The name is probably derived from tùùré, the word for 'elephant' in Soninké, the language of the Ghana Empire. The clan existed as kings of Zaghari on the middle Niger before the Moroccan invasion of Ghana. A theory of their origin holds that the Touré are descended from the "Roum," pre-Arab North African soldiers, and local women.

People
Notable people with the name include:

Touré (born 1971), American novelist and music journalist
Ahmed Touré (born 1987), Ivorian footballer
Ahmed Sékou Touré (1922–1984), Guinean politician, first President of Guinea 
Aïda Touré, Gabonese poet, artist and composer
Al Hassan Toure, Australian footballer
Alhassane Touré (born 1984), Malian footballer
Ali Farka Touré (1939–2006), Malian musician
Alioune Touré (born 1978), French footballer
Almamy Touré (born 1996), Malian footballer 
Amadou Touré (born 1982), Burkina Faso footballer 
Amadou Toumani Touré (1948–2020), Malian politician
Aminatou Maïga Touré, Nigerian diplomat
Ansu Toure (born 1981), Liberian footballer
Askia M. Touré (born 1938), American poet and essayist
Assimiou Touré (born 1988), Togolese footballer 
Bako Touré (1939–2001), Malian footballer
Bassala Touré (born 1976), Malian footballer 
Bassary Touré, Malian economist and politician
Cheikh Touré (born 1970), French athlete (long jump)
Chérif Touré Mamam (born 1978), Togolese footballer 
Clémentine Touré (born 1977), Ivorian footballer and football manager
Demba Touré (born 1984), Senegalese footballer
Doudou Touré (born 1991), Mauritanian footballer 
Hamadoun Touré, Malian diplomat
Hervé Touré (born 1982), French basketball player
Ibrahim Touré (1985–2014), Ivorian footballer
Ibrahima Touré (born 1985), Senegalese footballer 
José Touré (born 1961), French footballer
Karidja Touré (born 1994), French actress
Kolo Touré (born 1981), Ivorian footballer
Larsen Touré (born 1984), Guinean footballer
Mohamed Toure (born 2004), Australian footballer
Mohamed Touré (born 1997), Portuguese footballer
Samori Toure (American football) (born 1998), American football player
Samory Touré (c. 1830–1900), founder of the Wassoulou Empire
Sanoussi Touré (born c.1950), Malian politician
Sékou Touré (1934–2003), Ivorian footballer 
Sidi Touré (born 1959), Malian singer and songwriter
Sidya Touré (born 1945), Guinean politician
Thomas Touré (born 1993), Ivorian footballer
Vieux Farka Touré (born 1981), Malian musician
Yaya Touré (born 1983), Ivorian footballer
Younoussi Touré (1941–2022), Malian politician
Youssouf Touré (born 1986), French footballer
Zargo Touré (born 1989), Senegalese footballer

See also
Touré Embden (born 1966), Haitian American emcee known as MC Tee
Touré Kunda, a Senegalese music group
Toure' Murry (born 1989), American basketball player
Ture (disambiguation)

Notes

Soninke-language surnames
Surnames of Malian origin
Surnames of Mauritanian origin